Harry Andrew Sullivan  (April 22, 1888 – September 22, 1919) was a pitcher in Major League Baseball who played for the St. Louis Cardinals during the  season. He batted and threw left-handed.

Born in Rockford, Illinois, Sullivan attended Saint Louis University. He joined the Cardinals late in the season, appearing for them in two games, including one start. He allowed six runs (four earned) on four hits and two walks for a 36.00 ERA. He did not strike out a single batter in one inning of work and did not have a decision.

Sullivan died in Rockford, Illinois, at the age of 31.

References

Sources

Major League Baseball pitchers
St. Louis Cardinals players
Saint Louis Billikens baseball players
Baseball players from Illinois
Sportspeople from Rockford, Illinois
Saint Louis University alumni
1888 births
1919 deaths